William Mugeyi (born 4 July 1969) is a Zimbabwean footballer who last played for Bush Bucks in South Africa. He is the twin brother of Zimbabwean footballer Wilfred Mugeyi.

Career
Born in Salisbury (now Harare), Mugeyi had a 13-year club football career, spending most of it playing as a left back alongside his twin brother in the South African Premier Division with Umtata Bush Bucks. He won the Zimbabwean league with Black Aces in 1992 before moving to South Africa with Bush Bucks in 1993.

Mugeyi made several appearances for the Zimbabwe national football team, including twelve FIFA World Cup qualifying matches. He helped Zimbabwe win the 2000 COSAFA Cup, scoring twice in the final against Lesotho.

References 

1969 births
Sportspeople from Harare
Living people
Zimbabwean footballers
Zimbabwean expatriate footballers
Zimbabwe international footballers
Bush Bucks F.C. players
Expatriate soccer players in South Africa
Zimbabwean expatriate sportspeople in South Africa
Zimbabwean twins
Twin sportspeople
Association football defenders